Messe brève no. 7 is a missa brevis in C major by Charles Gounod, composed in 1877 for two vocal parts and organ, and expanded in 1890 to four choir parts and organ. It is subtitled "in C aux chapelles".

History 
Charles Gounod, known for operas, was a prolific composer of sacred music. In 1877, he composed the missa brevis in C major, without a Credo and Benedictus but with an added "". This first version was scored for two voices (solo and choir) and organ. He wrote a version for two soloists, tenor and bass, four-part choir and organ in 1890. At that time, "aux chapelles" (for chapels) was added to the title. It was first published in 1893. It was published again by Carus-Verlag in 1987, edited by Günter Graulich. In that edition, the music of "" is printed with the missing liturgical text Benedictus, adapted by Thomas Kohlhase.

The mass has been included in a recommendation for small choirs.

Composition 
Of the Order of Mass, Gounod omitted the Credo and Benedictus, but added a setting of "". The vocal parts of the mass are performed by two soloists (tenor and bass) and a choir of four parts in the final version. The soloists sing short versions within the structure, often both as a duet.

In the following table of the movements, the markings, keys and time signatures are taken from the choral score. All movements are in common-time.

The style is characterised by tone repetitions similar to liturgical chanting. The composer follows the declamation of the words also in motifs. The mass is intentionally simple, with some surprising harmonic developments.

Recording 
The mass was recorded as part of a collection of Musica Sacra, sacred music by Gounod, published in 2005 by Carus. It was performed by the chamber choir , conducted by Hans-Joachim Lustig, with Tobias Götting as the organist.

References

Sources 
 
 

Compositions by Charles Gounod
Gounod
1877 compositions
1890 compositions
Compositions in C major